The England Lions cricket team toured the United Arab Emirates in November–December 2018 to play one first-class match and seven limited overs matches against the Pakistan A team.

Pakistan A team won the one-off first-class match by 4 wickets.

Squads 

Josh Tongue was ruled out of the FC series and eventually replaced by Saqib Mahmood in the Lion's squad. Ahead of the tour, Lion's Matt Parkinson was ruled out from the entire series due to fracture in his back. Danny Briggs was named as replacement for him.

First-class series

Only Unofficial Test

List-A series

1st Unofficial ODI

2nd Unofficial ODI

3rd Unofficial ODI

4th Unofficial ODI

5th Unofficial ODI

T20 series

1st T20

2nd T20

References 

2018 in Emirati cricket
2019 in Emirati cricket